Chhatar Singh Darbar (born 8 January 1954) is a member of the 14th Lok Sabha of India. He represents the Dhar constituency of Madhya Pradesh and is a member of the Bharatiya Janata Party (BJP) political party.

External links
 Members of Fourteenth Lok Sabha - Parliament of India website

Living people
1954 births
India MPs 2004–2009
People from Dhar
Lok Sabha members from Madhya Pradesh
India MPs 1996–1997
Bharatiya Janata Party politicians from Madhya Pradesh